The Transgender HIV/Aids Prevention Program was launched by The Department of Family Practice and The Community Health Medical School at the University of Minnesota in 1992. The program targeted the local transgender community. It was estimated that in 1992 up to 17,000 people were HIV-antibody positive in the state of Minnesota. The organizers realized that there was a lack of knowledge and attitudinal barriers towards HIV prevention among transvestites and transsexuals. This knowledge deficit among the transgender community coupled with the steadily increasing number of people affected with HIV/AIDS at the time catalyzed the formation of the Transgender HIV Aids Prevention Program at the University of Minnesota.

Program objectives

The program was designed to be a potential suitable model for other communities to copy when targeting the transgender community and HIV/AIDS prevention. It aimed to demonstrate effective ways to reach the transgender population and change behaviours/attitudes that formed risk factors for HIV infection. The program had three main objectives; 1) Alter the way in which the transgender community behaved and understood the issue of HIV transmission and prevention; 2) Develop and implement an effective pilot program to realize the first objective; and 3) to evaluate the success or failure of the pilot program, specifically in terms of increasing the knowledge about HIV transmission/protection and changing the negative attitudes and behaviours putting the transgender community at risk.

Implementation

In June 1992, organizers of the program formed a core focus group, developing advertisements and short articles in order to promote participation of the workshops. The three workshops were held in September and November 1992 and February 1993 respectively. The workshops consisted of a panel of transgender people living with HIV/AIDS and the focus of the workshops was the impact of HIV/AIDS and what could be done in order to prevent the spread of the virus. Specifically, organizers had a focus on eroticizing safer sex and risk reduction strategies relating to the use of needles when injecting hormones and/or silicone. There were a total of 126 registrants of the program. Out of these 126 registrants, 86 participated in the workshops. 74 of these 86 participants participated in the study.

In May 1993, the examination and findings of these three workshops were concluded with the submission for publication of the "Transgender HIV/AIDS Prevention Program Manual". This manual is currently located at the Transgender Archives at the University of Victoria

Findings

The findings of the questionnaires done before, during, and two months after the workshop revealed that the workshops were successful, as there was an increase in relevant knowledge towards HIV/AIDS prevention among the Transgender population. There was an initial increase in positive attitudes among participants, however over time this diminished. The evaluation showed an improvement of community and social support for participants because of the program. The questionnaires failed to show that there was a decrease in unsafe sexual and needle practices.

The focus group evaluation unveiled the issues of understanding HIV/AIDS in the transgender community. The evaluation showed that there was an increase in awareness and personal significance which encouraged personal protection. It also brought to light that the risk for HIV/AIDS was behaviour based rather than based on an individual's sexual partner or orientation. It also exposed personal vulnerabilities which allowed people to develop personal prevention plans to change their risk behaviours.

Findings of the program brought new methods to better education prevention methods. The major method was to have stronger community involvement in the transgender community; specifically targeting "drag queens//female impersonators, transgender hustlers, prostitutes, and post-sex-reassigned transsexuals." Another method was to integrate HIV/AIDS prevention into education regarding sex, gender and sexuality. Furthermore, another method that was suggested in order to minimize the rate of infection was to create brochures specifically for transgender HIV/AIDS prevention. Lastly, the program found it very important to make health professionals aware of the issue of HIV/AIDS within the transgender community and the specific emotional and social aspects that greatly target this minority population in the process.

Conclusion

Results from the program unveiled multiple issues, concerns, solutions and new found knowledge of transgender people living with HIV/AIDS. There were three main concerns regarding HIV/AIDS within the transgender community at this time. The first concern was HIV/AIDS equating to stigmatization and shame. As one of the registrants said, the stigma that existed during this time made the participant feel "dirty… [and like]... a lower minority than most minorities" (19). Another concern was that HIV/AIDS would interfere with individuals seeking sex reassignment surgery. The final concern was that health professionals lacked transgender sensitivity.

The first part of the workshop focused on the impact of HIV/AIDS, and included a panel of transgender persons living with HIV/AIDS. The second part focused on eroticizing safer sex and risk reduction in the use of injection paraphernalia. Sharing needs to inject hormones or silicone was addressed as a special risk. The final part of the workshop focused on personal and community empowerment.

References

HIV/AIDS in the United States
HIV/AIDS prevention organizations
Transgender history in the United States
LGBT in Minnesota
University of Minnesota
1992 establishments in Minnesota
1992 in LGBT history